
John Phokas (Iōánnēs Phōkâs) or Phocas was a 12th-century Byzantine pilgrim to the Holy Land. He wrote an account of his travels, the so-called Ekphrasis or Concise Description of the Holy Places, which has been called "the most elegant of Palestinian pilgrimage accounts". Doubt has recently arisen over whether Phokas was in fact the author of the Ekphrasis, which has been re-attributed instead to the John Doukas who went on an imperial mission to the Holy Land in 1177.

Little biographical information about Phokas is available. One manuscript of the Ekphrasis contains a note stating that he was a priest and that his father, a certain Matthew, became a monk on Patmos. According to this marginal note, his trip to the Holy Land took place in either 1177 or 1195. He is known to have accompanied Emperor ManuelI (reigned 1143–80) on an expedition to the sea off Attaleia (now Antalya). He may be the same person as the "Focas" who, according to the Annales Herbipolenses, was sent by Manuel in 1147 to guide the crusading army of King Conrad III of Germany from Nicaea to Iconium.

Phokas's Ekphrasis is both concise and precise. He had a rather positive attitude towards the Crusaders. In some cases he provides unique information. He describes a fanatical Saracen sect called the Chasisioi (perhaps the Assassins). He calls the river Jordan "the holiest among rivers" and names three monasteries in the vicinity of site of the baptism of Jesus dedicated to Our Lady of Kalamon, John Chrysostom and John the Baptist. The latter was rebuilt, he says, by ManuelI. He also reports that Cana was nothing more than a kastellion (a small fortified settlement), that there were two monasteries (one Greek, one Latin) atop Mount Tabor, and that the site of ancient Jericho was covered in gardens and vineyards.

Besides the Bible, Phokas also quotes from such ancient authors as Josephus Flavius and Achilles Tatius. The Ekphrasis may have been written against the pilgrimage account of Constantine Manasses, who returned from the Holy Land disillusioned and wondering why Christ lived there. In the Ekphrasis, the beauty of the places is stressed repeatedly.

See also
 Phokas (Byzantine family)

Notes

References

External links

12th-century Byzantine writers
Byzantine geographers
Officials of Manuel I Komnenos
Christians of the Second Crusade
Holy Land travellers
Christian pilgrimages
Pilgrimage accounts
12th-century Eastern Orthodox priests